HMCS Provider was a replenishment oiler and sole ship of her class of first the Royal Canadian Navy and later the Canadian Forces. She was the first dedicated auxiliary oiler replenishment ship commissioned for the Royal Canadian Navy in 1963, and the largest ship built in Canada to that date. Originally assigned to the East coast, her open deck made her vulnerable and she was reassigned to the West coast. The ship was paid off in 1998, sold for scrap and broken up in Turkey in 2003.

Design and description
The design used standard commercial shipbuilding practices according to Lloyd's rules. However, the design was widened aft to accommodate possible future use of nuclear propulsion. This alteration led to vibration issues, which required further structural changes.

Provider was powered by a Westinghouse double reduction geared turbine engine creating . The two water-tube boilers could be controlled automatically during a nuclear attack. The ship was also provided with an emergency  Rover gas turbine engine, the first gas turbine engine installed in a Canadian naval vessel. The ship had a complement of 11 officers and 131 ratings.

The hoses and wire system that the Canadians had designed for Providers replenishment at sea operations became standard for all NATO replenishment oilers.

The ship had special accommodation for flag officers and an eight-berth hospital. Provider had a flight deck installed aft along with a hangar located below the funnel on the same deck as the flight deck. The vessel could carry up to six CH-124 Sea Kings.

Construction and career
First authorized on 15 April 1958, Provider was laid down by Davie Shipbuilding and Repairing Company Limited of Lauzon, Quebec on 21 June 1961. She was launched on 5 July 1962 and was commissioned by the Royal Canadian Navy on 28 September 1963 at Saint John, New Brunswick. The vessel cost $15,700,000. The vessel was homeported at CFB Halifax.

Provider was stationed in the Mediterranean Sea, along with two destroyers, in May 1967 to help support Canadian troops who were part of the United Nations Emergency Force in Gaza. The vessel's homeport was transferred to CFB Esquimalt on the west coast in 1969 following the arrival of the Protecteur-class ships.

A refit was completed on Provider at Burrard Dry Dock in 1982. Another refit was scheduled for Provider in 1987 to accommodate the desegregation of the Navy. Nineteen women joined a crew of then 210 on board Provider in 1987 after her refit.

Over a four-day period in June 1990, over 30,000 Russians toured the four ships, and their crews were welcomed into the town with open arms. Over 50,000 lapel pins, stickers, and flags were given by the crews of the Canadian ships, as well as showing the locals what a screwdriver was. After leaving Vladivostok, Provider rescued 88 Vietnamese who were adrift in the South China Sea before making a port call in Manila.

Provider escorted Huron to the Panama Canal in January 1991. Huron was on her way to CFB Halifax for refitting before heading into the Gulf War. Had the Gulf War continued, Provider and  would have either joined or relieved other Canadian ships in the war zone.

Relieving ships from CFB Halifax, Provider joined the United Nations embargo against Haiti in late 1993. In 1996, the home port of Provider was once again changed back to CFB Halifax.

The ship was paid off on 24 June 1998, two years later than originally planned, and remained in Halifax Harbour until 2002 while she awaited auction. Provider was sold for scrap and arrived in Aliağa, Turkey to be broken up on 28 August 2002.

References

Notes

Citations

References

External links

HMCS Provider

Auxiliary ships of the Royal Canadian Navy
Provider, HMCS
1962 ships
Ships built in Quebec